Alleyne Walker is a politician from the island of Grenada.  He currently serves as that nation's Minister of Housing, Lands and Community Development .

References

External links
Ministry webpage

Year of birth missing (living people)
Living people
Members of the House of Representatives of Grenada
Government ministers of Grenada
Place of birth missing (living people)